Thaumatopsis atomosella is a moth in the family Crambidae. It was described by William D. Kearfott in 1908. It is found in the US states of Arizona and California.

References

Crambini
Moths described in 1908
Moths of North America